Elvida is a melodramma or opera in one act by Gaetano Donizetti. Giovanni Schmidt wrote the Italian libretto. The opera was written as a pièce d'occasion for the birthday of Queen Maria of the Two Sicilies. The choice of subject matter was no doubt intended as an elegant acknowledgement of the Queen's Spanish ancestry. Donizetti received little financial reward for the work and, as a result, put the minimum of effort into its composition.

Elvida was first performed on 6 July 1826 at the Teatro San Carlo in Naples, but it "made little impression on the audience" After three performances, the piece lay forgotten until its performances and recordings in 2004.

Roles

Synopsis
Place: A fortified town in the Emirate of Granada.
Time: The late fifteenth century.

Scene 1
During the struggle for control of southern Spain, Elvida, a noble Castilian lady, has been captured by the Moors. For two months she has been held prisoner by Amur in one of the last remaining Moorish strongholds. However, Spanish troops led by Elvida’s fiancé, Alfonso, are now advancing on the town.

Amur wants to have Elvida put to death, rather than allow her to be saved by Alfonso’s troops. However, Amur’s son, Zeidar, has fallen in love with their beautiful captive and begs his father to give her up to the approaching Spanish, if only to save the town from destruction. Zeidar pleads with Elvida to marry him, but she contemptuously rejects both his advances and his father’s threats. The Moors murdered her father, and Elvida longs for retribution. She is led away to a hidden dungeon.

The Castilian army is now at the gates of the town, Amur recognizes that further resistance is hopeless, but knowing that Moorish reinforcements are close at hand, he is determined to make his escape through a secret passage, taking Zeidar with him.

Scene 2
Alfonso enters in triumph at the head of his troops. Although he is disappointed that Amur and Zeidar have apparently escaped, he is more concerned for the safety of Elvida. One of Amur’s slaves offers to lead him to the cavern where Elvida is being held captive.

Scene 3
Amur intends to use Elvida as a hostage to aid his escape with Zeidar. The two men enter the cavern in which she is imprisoned and try to force her to come with them. Elvida is defiant, and before they can drag her away, Spanish troops burst in. Amur draws his dagger with the intention of killing Elvida, but Zeidar seizes his arm and the troops are able to overpower him.

Amur curses his son for his betrayal, and at that moment word arrives that the Moorish reinforcements have been routed. In a magnanimous gesture Alfonso grants Zeidar his freedom and agrees to spare Amur’s life. There is general rejoicing as Alfonso announces his marriage to Elvida will take place on the following morning.

Recordings

References
Notes

Cited sources
Osborne, Charles, (1994), The Bel Canto Operas of Rossini, Donizetti, and Bellini, Portland, Oregon: Amadeus Press. 

Other sources
Allitt, John Stewart (1991), Donizetti: in the light of Romanticism and the teaching of Johann Simon Mayr, Shaftesbury: Element Books, Ltd (UK); Rockport, MA: Element, Inc.(USA)
Ashbrook, William (1982), Donizetti and His Operas, Cambridge University Press.  
Ashbrook, William (1998), "Donizetti, Gaetano" in Stanley Sadie (Ed.), The New Grove Dictionary of Opera, Vol. One. London: Macmillan Publishers, Inc.  
Ashbrook, William and Sarah Hibberd (2001), in Holden, Amanda (Ed.), The New Penguin Opera Guide, New York: Penguin Putnam. . pp. 224 – 247.
Black, John (1982), Donizetti’s Operas in Naples, 1822—1848. London: The Donizetti Society.
Commons, Jeffrey (2004), Programme notes accompanying the Opera Rara recording.
Loewenberg, Alfred (1970). Annals of Opera, 1597-1940, 2nd edition. Rowman and Littlefield
Sadie, Stanley, (Ed.); John Tyrell (Exec. Ed.) (2004), The New Grove Dictionary of Music and Musicians. 2nd edition. London: Macmillan.  (hardcover).   (eBook).
 Weinstock, Herbert (1963), Donizetti and the World of Opera in Italy, Paris, and Vienna in the First Half of the Nineteenth Century, New York: Pantheon Books.

External links
 
 Libretto
 Libretto, in Tutti i libretti delle opere di Gaetano Donizetti, pp. 1769ff.

Operas by Gaetano Donizetti
Italian-language operas
Operas
One-act operas
1826 operas
Opera world premieres at the Teatro San Carlo
Operas set in Spain